Anthony M. Aristar (born 1948 in Cape Town, South Africa) is a linguist, the founder of the LINGUIST List, an important linguistic resource on the web, and a professor emeritus of linguistics at Eastern Michigan University.

Studies
Aristar received his BA in Middle Eastern Studies from the University of Melbourne in Australia (1977), his MA in Semitic Languages from the University of Chicago (1980), and his PhD from the University of Texas at Austin in 1984 (Dissertation: On the Syntactic Incorporation of Linguistic Units).

Academic career
Aristar was co-director of the Institute for Language and Information Technology at Eastern Michigan University until 2013, when he retired. He has been involved in the establishment of standards for the dissemination and publication of linguistic information on the Internet, and was Principal Investigator of the E-MELD project, whose aim was also the establishment of standards for linguistic data. He was very involved in the preservation of endangered languages data. He was principal investigator of the Multitree project, and co-Principal Investigator of the LL-MAP project. As part of his work on the interoperability of digital linguistic data, he was involved with the Open Languages Archive Community (OLAC).  He was also involved in producing the 2007 ISO 639-3 standard for the coding of languages, in that this standard is a union of the Ethnologue code-set and a code-set for ancient and constructed languages produced at LINGUIST List by him.

Personal life
He is married to Helen Aristar-Dry, also a professor emeritus of linguistics at Eastern Michigan University, and former co-director of the institute he headed.

See also
 LINGUIST List

References

External links
Anthony Aristar's web page @ LINGUIST List

Linguists from the United States
Living people
1948 births